Madariaga is a Basque surname. It is derived from word madari (Basque for pear) Notable people with the surname include:

Francisco Javier Solana de Madariaga, KOGF (born 1942), Spanish physicist and Socialist politician
Joaquín Madariaga (1799–1848), soldier and Argentine politician
José Cortés de Madariaga (born 1766), South American patriot
Juan Madariaga (1809–1879), Argentine general who participated in the civil wars of the nineteenth century
Julen Madariaga (1932–2021), Basque Spanish politician and lawyer who co-founded the Basque armed separatist group ETA in 1959
Modesto Madariaga (1904–1974), Spanish aviation mechanic
Mónica Madariaga (1942–2009), Chilean lawyer, academic, and politician
Nieves de Madariaga or Nieves Mathews (1917–2003), author of Scottish and Spanish parentage
Salvador de Madariaga (1886–1978), Spanish diplomat, writer, historian and pacifist

See also
Madariaga – College of Europe Foundation, affiliated with the College of Europe
General Juan Madariaga, town in Buenos Aires Province, Argentina
General Madariaga Partido, partido located on the Atlantic coast of Buenos Aires Province in Argentina
Madara (disambiguation)
Madari
Madaria

Basque-language surnames